The Men's 50 Backstroke at the 10th FINA World Swimming Championships (25m) was swum 17–18 December 2010 in Dubai, United Arab Emirates. In the morning session of 17 December, 76 individuals swam in the Preliminary heats, with the top-16 swimmers advancing to swim again in the Semifinals that evening. The top-8 finishers in the Semifinals then advanced to the Final the next evening.

Records
At the start of the event, the existing World (WR) and Championship records (CR) were:

The following records were established during the competition:

Results

Heats

Semifinals
Semifinal 1

Semifinal 2

Final

References

Backstroke 050 metre, Men's
World Short Course Swimming Championships